Skateboarding arrived in China in April 1986 when an American skateboarder arrived in China to study Chinese at the Beijing Language Institute.  He says, "When I arrived in China, there wasn't even a word in Chinese for skateboard.  People were really interested in learning to ride, and in a few years Chinese skaters started appearing in almost every city I travelled to". Domestic skate companies and retailers began to appear at around the turn of the century, bringing the average price for a skateboard of ordinary quality down from an expensive 1000 yuan to around 280 yuan as of 2009. Skateboarding has been slow to develop in China because of the lack of a strong preexisting street culture and of skating infrastructure; nevertheless, it's estimated that as of 2009 there are 40,000 to 50,000 skateboarders in China.

The first major skateboard brand to enter China was Powell Peralta, who in the early 1990s gave Chinese skaters a taste of the skateboarding by organizing a skateboard club, sponsoring contests and bringing over famous professional skateboarders.  Many participants in the Powell events are still involved in the industry today, including Yuan Fei, who runs a skateshop in Qingdao and has the well-received skateboard brand, Lady, Wang Lei, the recipient of Powell's first board in China, who at 40 is still skating hard, and Xia Yu, who is now a well-known movie star and avid skateboard and snowboarder.

Another significant figure in the development of skateboarding in China has been Jeff Han (Han Minjie). After a decade-long career with a milk company, in 1999 Han quit and co-founded Fly Streetwear with Danny Yuan Yuan Zhang, the first skateshop in Shanghai.  He and Danny Yuan Yuan Zhang also founded Gift Skateboards together, a manufacturer that initially produced only boards for foreign brands but has now become the leading domestic skateboard brand; Cart Wheels, another skateboard brand; and Skatehere.com, the most popular Chinese-language skateboarding website. In addition to his companies, he runs a professional skateboarding team. In 2007, Nike Skateboarding created the Fly Milk Blazer Premium sneaker in tribute to Han.

Business
Along with Jeff Han's companies, one of the oldest and most important Chinese skateboard companies is Shehui (English: Society) Skateboards. Headquartered in Beijing, it was founded by Raph Cooper, a USC alum who had studied abroad at Peking University in 2000.

A number of Western skate shoe brands have presences in China. These brands include Vans, DC Shoes  Nike SB, Circa, Converse and Adidas. In the domain of skateboarding apparel, Jeff Han reports that
Vans is the No.1. Adidas is the new comer in China. I still remember that on the first opening day of Vans at Fly, we sold RMB 50,000 of Vans. As a matter of fact, before Vans’ official launch in China, it was already superbly popular in Beijing. Converse was replaced by Vans as the symbol of cool. Nike successfully launched some limited editions that are more expensive…
Han regards Nike Skateboarding's history in China as a major success story. Though not respected as a skate brand at the time they launched in the Chinese market in 2004, through sponsorships of successful Chinese skateboarders such as Che Lin and Zeng Guanhao as well as intense local marketing efforts, they won broad recognition in China.  ʻAukai is well known too.

The Biggest Skateboards Company is "Challenge Skateboards." and now they start their new company "FDskateboarding"（沸点滑板有限公司）to promote their domestic business. They have 11 skateboard (and skateboard related) brands: Symbolic Skateboards, Boiling Skateboards, Justice Skateboards, Black Knight Skateboards, Psychos Skateboards, Peer Trucks, Donuts Wheels, a Chinese skateboarding portals website:Chinaskateboards.cn & a printed magazine Whatsup skateboard magazine（Chinese）.

Skateparks and other skating locations
Chinese skateboarding champion Che Lin estimated in 2009 that there were fewer than ten skateparks in China.

Ningbo

Skateboard Supercross Ningbo skatepark (SBSX Ningbo)
One of the largest skatepark in the China with 42,000sqf. SBSX Ningbo is a game changing skatepark and pumptrack aka super track. It was built inside of Georgia School Ningbo where 2000 studentstake skateboarding as PE Class daily. ⁣
⁣
The park features ⁣an Intermediate level street course, a semi enclosed bowl, ⁣rails and the world’s first concrete pumptrack designed for multiperson races.

The park is lit, allowing night sessions.

Shanghai

SMP Skatepark (Shanghai Multimedia Park)
Formerly the largest skatepark in the world. SMP is located on the outskirts of Shanghai in New Jiangwan City. It was completed in 2005 and is more than 12,000 square meters in size, containing the world's longest vert ramp, the world's largest concrete skate bowl, a huge downhill 3/4 to full pipe, several smaller bowls, a street section, and a 5,000-seat stadium. Despite the publicity of the high-profile events that have taken place there, it has attracted sparse crowds.

YuanShen Skatepark (Top Toys)
This park was created when the red metal ramps from the SMP skatepark were transferred to the YuanShen Stadium in 2008.  These metal ramps were originally used as a competition course in the stadium portion of the SMP skatepark.  The skatepark is often referred to as the Red SMP skatepark.  Top Toys took over management of YuanShen skatepark located on Line 6 in June 2010 when they opened a skateshop on location.

Bin Jiang Skatepark
This is a sunken plaza/street style course with stairs, ledges, banks, kickers, hubbas, etc. There are no transitions. It is located next to the Huangpu River and is lit in the evening.

Jinqiao Skatepark
Located in Pudong, built by B&E Action Sports. Concrete park with granite ledges, rails, and a 1.6m transition bowl.

Love Park (LP)
Small street spot with ledges and stairs. Located near the Line 8 Dashije station.

Iconx Indoor Skatepark
Shanghai's first public indoor skatepark. Opened in June 2014. This park has a 5-foot mini, boxes, banks, rails, ledges, and a few transitions.

Beijing
The most popular skating location in Beijing is the large Beijing Fashion Sports Park.  It was known as Woodward Beijing from its opening in 2010 until March 2014. It is located in the rural southern 6th ring road. It is one of the largest indoor skate parks in the world, and it previously hosted the notorious Vans Night. There are also several skateparks. Ezone Sk8 Park in Fangzhuang hosts Andrew Guan's (Guan Mu's) Kicker Club, a nationwide skateboarding club with approximately 200 members in Beijing. (Guan runs a blog named after his club.) Sk8 Warehouse, founded in 2009, is an indoor park in an industrial complex just north of Shuangjing Bridge. Honglingjin Park, in Chaoyang District, also contains a skatepark. In May 2010, Woodward Youth Action Sports Camp opened in Daxing District; it contains facilities for skateboarding, BMX, and motocross and represents a government investment of $21.96 million. There are also plenty of small skateparks in the Shunyi area inside the villas such as Yosemite and Dragon Bay villa.

Shenzhen
Shenzhen is the most popular destination for visiting pros. Spots in Shenzhen have been featured in videos by Nike Skateboarding, Zero Skateboards, and Transworld Skateboarding. Shenzhen is known for its smooth black marble ledges and police officer and security guards who are largely indifferent to skateboarding. In 2009, Shenzhen Museum became the first area in Shenzhen where skateboarding was prevented when authorities placed flower pots around the central ledge.

In 2011, Transworld Skateboarding listed Shenzhen as one of the best 10 cities to skate in the world. Every winter skateboarders from all over the world come to skate and spend their winter in Shenzhen.

References

 SBSX Park Ningbo, Skateboard Supercross official website

Further reading
 Sedo, Tim "Dead-stock Boards, Blown-out Spots, and the Olympic Games: Global Twists and Local Turns in the Formation of China's Skateboarding Community," in William D Coleman, Petra Rethmann, Imre Szeman, Eds., Cultural Autonomy: Frictions and Connections (Vancouver: University of British Columbia Press, 2010)

China
Sport in China by sport